Akhkinchu-Borzoy (Äxkinçu-Borze), also spelled as Akhkinchu-Borzoi, is a rural locality (a selo) in Kurchaloyevsky District, Chechnya.

Administrative and municipal status 
Municipally, Akhkinchu-Borzoy is incorporated as Akhkinchu-Borzoyskoye rural settlement. It is the administrative center of the municipality and the only settlement included in it.

Geography 

Akhkinchu-Borzoy is located on the left bank of the Gums River in a mountainous area.

The nearest settlements to Akhkinchu-Borzoy are Dzhigurty in the north, Gansolchu in the east, Yalkhoy-Mokhk in the south, and Khidi-Khutor in the south-west.

History 
In 1944, after the genocide and deportation of the Chechen and Ingush people and the Chechen-Ingush ASSR was abolished, the village of Akhkinchu-Borzoy was renamed to Novo-Ritlyab, and was settled by Avar people from the village of Ritlyab in the neighboring republic of Dagestan.

In 1957, when the Vaynakh people returned and the Chechen-Ingush ASSR was restored, the village regained its old Chechen name, Akhkinchu-Borze.

On 12 January 2002, during a special operation, Salman Basayev, the father of Shamil Basayev, was apparently killed in the village.

Population 
 1990 Census: 858
 2002 Census: 1,282
 2010 Census: 1,889
 2019 estimate: 2,046

According to the results of the 2010 Census, the majority of residents of Akhkinchu-Borzoy (1,887) were ethnic Chechens, with 2 people from other ethnic backgrounds.

Infrastructure 
Akhkinchu-Borzoy hosts a mosque and one secondary school.

References 

Rural localities in Kurchaloyevsky District